Matt Eisenhuth (born 20 August 1992) is an Australian professional rugby league footballer who plays as a  for the Penrith Panthers in the NRL.

He previously played for the Wests Tigers in the National Rugby League.

Background
Eisenhuth was born in Auburn, New South Wales, Australia.

He played his junior rugby league for the Wentworthville Magpies, before being signed by the Parramatta Eels.

Eisenhuth is the cousin of Australian international and former New South Wales State of Origin captain Paul Gallen.

Playing career

Early career
From 2010 to 2012, Eisenhuth played for the Parramatta Eels' NYC team. In 2010, he played for the Australian Schoolboys. In 2013, he graduated to the Eels' New South Wales Cup team, Wenworthville Magpies. Midway through 2013, he joined the Penrith Panthers, after being cut by then Eels coach Ricky Stuart.

In 2014, Eisenhuth overcame fears that he might not play football again, after having a tumour found in his knee. He had the tumour cut out, with the hole filled up with bone cement. In 2016, he joined the Wests Tigers.

2017
In round 15, Eisenhuth made his NRL debut for the Tigers against the Cronulla-Sutherland Sharks, and played every remaining game of the season in first grade. After initially playing from the bench, he cemented a position starting at lock for the last 6 games of the year.

In August, Eisenhuth re-signed with the Tigers on a 2-year contract until the end of 2019. He said, "For me, it was a pretty easy decision to extend my time here. This club stood by me and gave me a shot nobody else was and they rewarded me with a debut and constant first-grade, so in my mind, I wasn’t looking to go anywhere else. I think I’ve been improving week in and week out, so I’m very happy to be here for the next couple of years."

2018
In round 4, Eisenhuth scored his first NRL try, against the Parramatta Eels in the Tigers' 30-20 win at ANZ Stadium. Midseason, he signed a further extension to remain at Wests Tigers until the end of 2020, with coach Ivan Cleary calling him, "a key member of our team".

Towards the end of the season, Eisenhuth was a described as a player who embodies, "what it means to be a tireless worker". Leading his club in tackle counts, decoy runs, and second in support plays, he was considered one of the hardest workers in the NRL. He scored 2 tries and played in all 24 of the Wests Tigers games for the season.

2019
Eisenhuth played 21 games for Wests in the 2019 NRL season as the club finished ninth and missed out on the finals.

2020
On 28 September, Eisenhuth was one of eight players who were released by the Wests Tigers.
On 30 October, he signed a two year deal with Penrith, returning to the club where he played reserve grade.

2021
Eisenhuth played 19 games for Penrith in the 2021 NRL season and featured in the clubs qualifying final loss to South Sydney.

2022
Eisenhuth played 16 games for Penrith in the 2022 NRL season.  On 25 September, Eisenhuth played in Penrith's NSW Cup Grand Final victory over Canterbury.
On 2 October 2022, Eisenhuth played for Penrith in their NRL State Championship victory over Norths Devils.

2023
On 18 February, Eisenhuth played in Penrith's 13-12 upset loss to St Helens RFC in the 2023 World Club Challenge.

References

External links

Penrith Panthers profile
Wests Tigers profile
NRL profile

1992 births
Living people
Australian rugby league players
Penrith Panthers players
Rugby league props
Rugby league second-rows
Rugby league locks
Rugby league players from New South Wales
Wentworthville Magpies players
Windsor Wolves players
Wests Tigers players
Wests Tigers NSW Cup players